Musick is an old-fashioned spelling for the art form known as music. Musick may also refer to:

Places
Musick, West Virginia, US
Musick Point, New Zealand, named after Ed Musick
Musick Light, lighthouse on Kanton Island, Kiribati, also named after Ed Musick

People with the surname
Archie Musick (1902–1978), American painter
Ed Musick (1894–1938), American pilot
Jim Musick (1910–1992), American footballer
John R. Musick (1849–1901), American historical novelist and poet
Pat Musick (born 1949), American voice actress
Ruth Ann Musick (1897 [or 1899]—1974), American author and folklorist

Music
Musicking, a noun by Christopher Small meaning any activity involving or related to music performance

See also
Music (disambiguation)